Canarias (F86), is the last of the six Spanish-built s, based on the American  design, of the Spanish Navy.

Construction and career 
Laid down on 15 April 1992, and launched on 21 June 1993, Canarias was commissioned in service in 1995.

The ship features a series of improvements to her previous sisters, with a new Meroka mod 2B CIWS, and upgraded fire control systems with Mk.92 mod6 CORT (Coherent Receiver Transmitter) and SPS-49(v)5 radar instead of previous (v)4.

All of these Spanish frigates have the length of the later Oliver Hazard Perry frigates, and have a wider beam than the US Navy design, and therefore able to carry more top weight. Fin stabilizers are fitted.

Gallery

Other units of class 
 
 
 
 
 

Ships of the Spanish Navy
1993 ships
Santa María-class frigates